Papilio plagiatus, the mountain mimetic swallowtail, is a butterfly of the family Papilionidae. It is found in the forests of Nigeria, Cameroon, the Central African Republic, southern Sudan, the Republic of the Congo, Uganda and the northern part of the Democratic Republic of the Congo. The habitat mainly consists of submontane forests but adults may also be found flying in lowland forests.

Taxonomy
Papilio plagiatus is a member of the cynorta species group. The members of the clade are:

Papilio arnoldiana Vane-Wright, 1995
Papilio cynorta Fabricius, 1793
Papilio plagiatus Aurivillius, 1898

References

External links
Butterfly corner Images from Naturhistorisches Museum Wien

Butterflies described in 1898
plagiatus
Butterflies of Africa
Taxa named by Per Olof Christopher Aurivillius